Ayanoğlu is a village in the Yedisu District, Bingöl Province, Turkey. The village is populated by Kurds of the Çarekan tribe and had a population of 64 in 2021.

The hamlets of Konacık and Yoncalık are attached to the village.

References 

Villages in Yedisu District
Kurdish settlements in Bingöl Province